The 2014–15 Appalachian State Mountaineers men's basketball team represented Appalachian State University during the 2014–15 NCAA Division I men's basketball season. The Mountaineers, led by first year head coach Jim Fox, played their home games at the George M. Holmes Convocation Center and were first year members of the Sun Belt Conference. They finished the season 11–7, 9–11 in Sun Belt play to finish in a tie for sixth place.

Due to low APR scores, the Mountaineers were banned from postseason play, including the Sun Belt Tournament.

Roster

Schedule

|-
!colspan=9 style="background:#000000; color:#FFCF00;"| Exhibition

|-
!colspan=9 style="background:#000000; color:#FFCF00;"| Regular season

References
http://www.appstatesports.com/SportSelect.dbml?&DB_OEM_ID=21500&SPID=12824&SPSID=104520

Appalachian State Mountaineers men's basketball seasons
Appalachian State
2014 in North Carolina
2015 in sports in North Carolina